Hans-Jürgen Hehn (born 1 October 1944) is a retired German épée fencer. He won silver medals in the individual and team events at the 1976 Summer Olympics.

References

External links
 

1944 births
Living people
People from Lauda-Königshofen
Sportspeople from Stuttgart (region)
People from the Republic of Baden
German male fencers
Olympic fencers of West Germany
Fencers at the 1972 Summer Olympics
Fencers at the 1976 Summer Olympics
Olympic silver medalists for West Germany
Olympic medalists in fencing
Medalists at the 1976 Summer Olympics